The 338th Infantry Regiment was a National Army Infantry Regiment first organized for service in World War I as part of the 85th Infantry Division in Europe.  It later served in the Mediterranean Theater during World War II.  Since then it has served as a training Regiment, training Army Reserve and Army National Guard Soldiers for service in support of the Global War on Terror.

Service history

World War I
The regiment was constituted 5 August 1917 in the National Army as the 338th Infantry and assigned to the 169th Infantry Brigade of the 85th Division. It was organized at Camp Custer, Michigan, on 30 August 1917.  In August 1917, the regiment was organized with 3,755 officers and enlisted men:
 Headquarters & Headquarters Company- 303
 Supply Company- 140
 Machine Gun Company- 178
 Medical & Chaplain Detachment- 56
 Infantry Battalion (x3)- 1,026
 Headquarters- 2
 Rifle Company (x4)- 256
The Doughboys of the regiment deployed to France as part of the American Expeditionary Forces and were billeted in the cities of Nevers and Cosne.  The regiment didn't participate in any named campaigns during the war; its Infantrymen were used as individual replacements to the fighting Divisions. After completing its war service in France it was demobilized at Camp Custer on 14 April 1919.

Between the World Wars
The 338th Infantry was reconstituted 24 June 1921 and assigned to the 85th Division (later redesignated as the 85th Infantry Division).  The headquarters was at Lansing, Michigan.

World War II
The 338th Infantry was ordered into active military service 15 May 1942 and reorganized at Camp Shelby, Mississippi. In July 1943, the regiment was organized with 3,256 officers and enlisted men:
 Headquarters & Headquarters Company- 111
 Service Company- 114
 Anti-Tank Company- 165
 Cannon Company- 118
 Medical Detachment- 135
 Infantry Battalion (x3)- 871
 Headquarters & Headquarters Company- 126
 Rifle Company (x3)- 193
 Weapons Company- 156
The regiment departed Hampton Roads Port of Embarkation in December 1943 aboard the USS General William A. Mann with its supporting 329th Field Artillery Battalion.  Arriving in Italy on March 14, the 339th Regimental Combat Team was attached to the 88th Infantry Division and became the first regiment of the 85th to see combat during World War II on the Minturno-Castelforte  front north of Naples, on 28 March.   After service in the Mediterranean Theater it was disbanded 25 August 1945 at Camp Patrick Henry, Virginia.

Post World War II
The 338th Infantry was reconstituted 6 November 1946 in the Organized Reserves and assigned to the 85th Infantry Division with headquarters at Peoria, Illinois.  On 9 July 1952, the Organized Reserve was redesignated the Army Reserve.  On 1 April 1952, the headquarters was relocated to Danville, Illinois.  On 1 June 1959 the 338th Infantry was reorganized as a training unit and was redesignated as the 338th Regiment, an element of the 85th Division (Training), with headquarters at Chicago, Illinois.

Current assignment
As part of Operation Bold Shift, the 338th mission is to train Army Reserve and Army National Guard Soldiers for war service before dispatch to the War in Afghanistan, the Iraq War, or elsewhere. All three battalions are elements of the 85th Support Command under the operational control of First Army. , the 1st Battalion is stationed at Fort McCoy, Wisconsin, with the 181st Infantry Brigade, while the 2nd and 3rd Battalions are stationed at Camp Atterbury, Indiana, with the 157th Infantry Brigade.  Each battalion provides Observer/Controllers to the NTC and JRTC to train units conducting rotations as well as conducting exercises at their home stations.

Campaign streamers

Decorations

References

338th Regiment Lineage and Honors

Infantry regiments of the United States Army
United States Army Reserve
Military units and formations in Wisconsin